Rastoropny was a  of the Soviet and later Russian navy.

Development and design 

The project began in the late 1960s when it was becoming obvious to the Soviet Navy that naval guns still had an important role particularly in support of amphibious landings, but existing gun cruisers and destroyers were showing their age. A new design was started, employing a new 130 mm automatic gun turret.

Construction and career 
Rastoropny was laid down on 15 August 1986 and launched on 4 June 1988 by Zhdanov Shipyard in Leningrad. She was commissioned on 30 December 1989.

She took part on April 16, 1997 in the command-staff exercises of the Northern Fleet without going to sea. The actions of the ship's crew were rated good. On December 31, 1997, she was transferred to category 2nd reserve

On January 18, 1998 of the following year, ammunition was unloaded from the her.

In October 2000, the ship made an inter-fleet transition from the main base of the Northern Fleet of Severomorsk to Saint Petersburg to undergo medium repairs and modernization. Due to the lack of funding since 2000, the ship was laid up at JSC Shipbuilding Plant Severnaya Verf.

On September 16, 2014, she left Severnaya Verf and was transferred to Kronstadt under tow.

On June 22, 2015, it was announced that she was to be scrapped, and by September 9 of the same year, the process had begun with the removal of her gun turrets.

In April 2016, the Russian Ministry of Defence officially requested bids for a contract for the scrapping of Rastoropny along with seven other naval vessels.

References 

1988 ships
Ships built at Severnaya Verf
Cold War destroyers of the Soviet Union
Sovremenny-class destroyers